Below is a sortable list of compositions by Henri Vieuxtemps.  The works are categorized by genre, opus number, date of composition, date of first publication, titles and scoring.

Opus numbers 1 through 5 (unused) were possibly designated for juvenile works.  The date of composition for many works is unclear, and often appears in many sources to be based on the date of the first publication.

Sources
 Radoux, Jean Théodore (1835–1911). Vieuxtemps: Sa vie, ses œuvres, A. Bénard, Liège, 1891.

Vieuxtemps, Henri, List of compositions by